A standing eight count, also known as a protection count, is a boxing judgment call made by a referee during a bout. When invoked, the referee stops the action and counts to eight. During that time, the referee will determine if the boxer can continue. When the count reaches eight, the referee often moves back two steps and instructs the boxer to walk towards him and hold his arms out. This helps the referee determine if the boxer is functioning and alert enough to continue. If the boxer is unsteady on his feet, or seems unable to focus on the referee, the bout is ended on account of a TKO. Typically, a boxer can take up to three standing eight counts in a round. 

The standing eight count is designed to protect boxers by allowing the referee to step in and give an overwhelmed fighter an eight-second respite. The standing eight count was instituted in 1982 after the death of boxer Kim Duk-koo. The Association of Boxing Commissions later eliminated the standing eight count in 1998 and it is usually not invoked in professional bouts today.

A standing eight count is different from a mandatory eight count, which is only assessed once a fighter is knocked down.

External links 

 Standing Eight Count at Sports Pundit

References

Boxing rules and regulations